Leporinus paranensis is a species of Leporinus widely found in the Paraná River basin in South America. This species can reach a length of  SL.

References

Oyakawa, O.T., 1998. Catalogo dos tipos de peixes recentes do Museu de Zoologia da USP. I. Characiformes (Teleostei: Ostariophysi). Pap. Avuls. Zool. 39(23):443-507. 

Taxa named by Júlio César Garavello
Taxa named by Heraldo Antonio Britski
Taxa described in 1987
Fish described in 1987
Anostomidae